The Sybase Match Play Championship was a women's professional golf tournament for three seasons on the LPGA Tour, held at Hamilton Farm Golf Club in Gladstone, New Jersey. First played in 2010, it was the only match play format event on the LPGA Tour schedule.  The previous match play tournament was the HSBC Women's World Match Play Championship, played from 2005 to 2007, with all three events at Hamilton Farm.

The title sponsor was Sybase, an enterprise software and services company headquartered in Dublin, California. It previously sponsored the Sybase Classic, a stroke play event on the LPGA Tour also held in the New York-New Jersey area through 2009. Sybase was acquired by SAP in 2010, which elected not to continue as title sponsor in 2013.

Azahara Muñoz won her first title on the LPGA Tour at the final edition in 2012.

Selection process
The 64-player field for the 2012 event was selected as follows:

 Top 48 players from Category 1 on the 2012 LPGA Priority List (2011 final money list plus medical exemptions)
 Two (2) sponsor invites
 Top two (2) finishers, not otherwise qualified, after the 2nd round of the Mobile Bay LPGA Classic (April 26-27)
Top twelve (12) players from the 2012 LPGA Official Money List at the conclusion of the Mobile Bay LPGA Classic (April 29), not otherwise qualified

Schedule
A six-round event scheduled over four days, one round each was played on Thursday and Friday to reduce the field from 64 to 16 for Saturday. Two rounds were scheduled for each day on the weekend, with morning and afternoon sessions.

2012 course layout
Hamilton Farm Golf Club

(Reflects the layout for the LPGA event; the nines are switched for HFGC members.)

Winners

Prize money breakdown

References

External links

LPGA official website
LPGA official tournament microsite
Hamilton Farm Golf Club.com

Former LPGA Tour events
Golf in New Jersey
Recurring sporting events established in 2010
History of women in New Jersey